North Settlement Methodist Church is a historic Methodist church on County Route 10, east of the junction with County Route 32C in Ashland, Greene County, New York.  It was built about 1826 and is a one-story, four by three bay, post and beam frame church with a modestly pitched gable roof.  Also on the property is a small wood frame privy.

It was added to the National Register of Historic Places in 1996.

See also
West Settlement Methodist Church, also in Ashland and NRHP-listed
National Register of Historic Places listings in Greene County, New York

References

Methodist churches in New York (state)
Churches on the National Register of Historic Places in New York (state)
Federal architecture in New York (state)
Churches in Greene County, New York
National Register of Historic Places in Greene County, New York